The Grand Army of the Republic Memorial Arch in Junction City, Kansas, USA, was listed on the National Register of Historic Places in 2017.

It was erected in 1898. Located at the corner of 6th and Washington in Junction City, it is known also as the Heritage Park Memorial Arch.

References

Monuments and memorials on the National Register of Historic Places in Kansas
National Register of Historic Places in Geary County, Kansas
Buildings and structures completed in 1898